Major General Piyal Abeysekera, USP (also known as E P De Z Abeysekera) was a Sri Lankan senior army officer and the former Deputy Chief of Staff of Sri Lanka Army.

Early life and education
Piyal received his education from Nalanda College Colombo. He holds a MSc from General Sir John Kotelawala Defence University in Military Science.

Military career
Abeysekera joined Sri Lanka Army as an officer cadet in 1980 and was commissioned as a Second Lieutenant in the Regular Force. Piyal has held key appointments such as Master-General of ordinance branch, Colonel commandant of Sri Lanka Signals Corps, Commander Sri Lanka Light Infantry, Chief Signal Officer, Adjutant General, Director Operations at Secretariat for Coordinating the Peace Process (SCOPP).

References

Further reading 
 Army Signal Association
 Assistance to ex-Servicemen
 SLAF emerged victorious at the Defence Services Beach Volleyball Championship 2012
 Demise of major general WMP Fernando VSV USP ndc psc (Rted) a severe loss to GWESRA
 SLAF men and women Beach Volleyball champs

Year of birth missing (living people)
Sri Lankan Buddhists
Sri Lankan major generals
Sinhalese military personnel
Alumni of Nalanda College, Colombo
Living people
Sri Lanka Signals Corps officers